Pamela Marie Iovino is an American politician from the Commonwealth of Pennsylvania. A Democrat, she was elected to the Pennsylvania State Senate for the 37th district and served from 2019 to 2020.

Education and early career 
Iovino was raised in a suburb outside Pittsburgh. She graduated from Gettysburg College with a bachelor's degree in political science in 1978. She joined the United States Navy as an ensign in 1980. She eventually earned the rank of captain. Iovino earned a Master of Arts in national security and strategic studies from the Naval War College in 1993. In 2004, Iovino became Assistant Secretary in the United States Department of Veterans Affairs for Congressional and Legislative Affairs.

Earlier political career 

On November 19, 2017, local Democrats chose former U.S. Assistant Attorney Conor Lamb during a nominating convention instead. Iovino placed third on both ballots, trailing behind Westmoreland County Commissioner Gina Cerilli and Lamb, the eventual special election winner.

Pennsylvania Senate 

After Guy Reschenthaler, who represented the 37th district in the Pennsylvania State Senate, was elected to the United States House of Representatives in 2018, a special election was called to fill the remainder of his term in the state senate.

Democrats selected Iovino as their nominee, and she faced Republican D. Raja. On April 2, 2019, Iovino defeated Raja, receiving 52% of the vote. Iovino was formally sworn in on April 29, 2019.

During the COVID-19 pandemic, Iovino sponsored an amendment clarifying that volunteer firefighting companies could use Volunteer Firefighting Relief Association funds to sanitize and disinfect equipment.  In July 2020, Iovino signed a letter urging Governor Tom Wolf to ease restrictions on bars and restaurants.

In July 2020, Iovino lost her wallet, which was coincidentally found and returned by her Republican opponent Devlin Robinson.

Iovino was defeated by Devlin Robinson on November 3, 2020.

References

External links
 

Living people
People from Mt. Lebanon, Pennsylvania
21st-century American politicians
Gettysburg College alumni
Naval War College alumni
United States Navy captains
United States Department of Veterans Affairs officials
1956 births
Military personnel from Pennsylvania
Democratic Party Pennsylvania state senators